Moore County Hunt Lands and Mile-Away Farms, also known as Mile-Away Farms, is a national historic district located near Southern Pines, Moore County, North Carolina. It encompasses 13 contributing buildings, 4 contributing sites, and 5 contributing structures on recreational hunt lands and an assemblage of equine farms and facilities near Southern Pines.  They include the Moore County Hunt Lands (c. 1929-1963), a System of Fire Lanes (c. 1934) by the Civilian Conservation Corps, a System of Hunt Trails (c. 1929-1963), a System of Jumps and Fences (c. 1942-1963), a System of Earths (Man-made Fox Dens) (c. 1942-1963), Mile-Away Farms (c. 1942-1963), Mile-Away Farms (c. 1937-1963) including the Moss Residence, Brewster Barn Complex (c. 1948-1963), and The Paddock Jr. (c. 1950-1963).

It was added to the National Register of Historic Places in 2013.

References

Civilian Conservation Corps in North Carolina
Farms on the National Register of Historic Places in North Carolina
Historic districts on the National Register of Historic Places in North Carolina
Buildings and structures in Moore County, North Carolina
National Register of Historic Places in Moore County, North Carolina